A standard tetrapolar telephone plug in electronics and telecommunications, has four round metal pins and one plastic pin. The design is only used in Belgium for telephone wiring.  It is similar to the tripolar telephone plug of Italy and also the Swedish telephone plug.

The plastic pin adds a presence function. When not inserted into a jack, the jack itself (mechanically) connects the incoming line to the next socket. The article on the Swedish telephone plug details its functional principles.

References

Telephone connectors